Priam is an unincorporated community in Kandiyohi County, Minnesota, United States.

Notable person
Roy C. Jensen, Minnesota legislator and farmer, owned a dairy farm near Priam.

Notes

Unincorporated communities in Kandiyohi County, Minnesota
Unincorporated communities in Minnesota